James J. Ward (born Jens P. Wilson in 1886 in Denmark – January 7, 1923) was a pioneer aviator who made one of the earliest attempts at transcontinental flight.

Biography
He flew a Curtiss Model D pusher biplane named the "Hearst Pathfinder". On September 13, 1911 he attempted to win the William Randolph Hearst Prize flying from Governors Island in New York to   California. He withdrew from the race on September 22, 1911 after his aircraft's engine failed and he crashed in Addison, New York.

References

External links
James J. Ward at Early Aviators

1880s births
1923 deaths
1911 in aviation
Danish emigrants to the United States